Kazakh or Qazaq (Latin:  or , Cyrillic:  or , Arabic Script:  or ,) is a Turkic language of the Kipchak branch spoken in Central Asia by Kazakhs. It is closely related to Nogai, Kyrgyz and Karakalpak. It is the official language of Kazakhstan and a significant minority language in the Ili Kazakh Autonomous Prefecture in Xinjiang, north-western China and in the Bayan-Ölgii Province of western Mongolia. The language is also spoken by many ethnic Kazakhs throughout the former Soviet Union (some 472,000 in Russia according to the 2010 Russian Census), Germany, and Turkey.

Like other Turkic languages, Kazakh is an agglutinative language and employs vowel harmony. Ethnologue recognizes three mutually intelligible dialect groups, Northeastern Kazakh, the most widely spoken variety which also serves as the basis for the standard language, Southern Kazakh and Western Kazakh. The language share a degree of mutual intelligiblity with closely related Karakalpak while its Western dialects maintain limited mutual intelligibility with Altai languages.

In October 2017, Kazakh president Nursultan Nazarbayev decreed that the writing system would change from using Cyrillic to Latin script by 2025. The proposed Latin alphabet has been revised several times and as of January 2021 is close to the inventory of the Turkish alphabet, though lacking the letters C and Ç and having four additional letters: Ä, Ñ, Q and Ū (though other letters such as Y have different values in the two languages). It is scheduled to be phased in from 2023 to 2031.

Geographic distribution
Speakers of Kazakh (mainly Kazakhs) are spread over a vast territory from the Tian Shan to the western shore of the Caspian Sea. Kazakh is the official state language of Kazakhstan, with nearly 10 million speakers (based on information from the CIA World Factbook on population and proportion of Kazakh speakers).

In China, nearly two million ethnic Kazakhs and Kazakh speakers reside in the Ili Kazakh Autonomous Prefecture of Xinjiang.

History

The first people to inhabit the territory of modern Kazakhstan were the Scythians, who were of Iranian descent.  The Göktürks migrated into the area in the sixth century AD and conquered much of the Scythian homeland, which led to the Turkification of the region.  In the 12th century AD, the Kimeks later succeeded the Göktürks and also introduced a new Turkic tongue to the Kazakh steppe.

The Kipchak branch of Turkic languages, which Kazakh is borne out of, was mainly solidified during the reign of the Golden Horde, whose inhabitants fully spread Islam and the closest predecessor of the Kazakh language to the Kazakh steppe.  The modern Kazakh language is said to have originated in approximately 1465 AD during the formation of the Sunni Muslim Kazakh Khanate.  Modern Kazakh is likely a descendant of both Chagatay Turkic as spoken by the Timurids and Kipchak Turkic as spoken in the Golden Horde.

As a language that is mostly spoken by a deeply Muslim ethnic group, Kazakh uses a high volume of loanwords from Persian and Arabic due to the frequent historical interactions between Kazakhs and Iranian ethnic groups to the south.  Additionally, Persian was a lingua franca in the Kazakh Khanate, which allowed Kazakhs to mix Persian words into their own spoken and written vernacular.  Meanwhile, Arabic was used by Kazakhs in mosques and mausoleums, serving as a language exclusively for religious contexts similar to how Latin served as a liturgical language in the European cultural sphere.

The Kazakhs used the Arabic script to write their language until approximately 1929.  In the early 1900s, Kazakh activist Ahmed Baytursinuli reformed the Kazakh-Arabic alphabet, but his work was largely overshadowed by the Soviet presence in Central Asia.  At that point, the new Soviet regime forced the Kazakhs to use a Latin script, and then a Cyrillic script in the 1940s in an effort to thoroughly Russianize them.  Today, Kazakhs use the Arabic, Latin, and Cyrillic scripts to write their language.

Writing system 

The oldest known written records of languages closely related to Kazakh were written in the Old Turkic alphabet, though it is not believed that any of these varieties were direct predecessors of Kazakh. Modern Kazakh, going back approximately one thousand years, was written in the Arabic script until 1929, when Soviet authorities introduced a Latin-based alphabet, and then a Cyrillic alphabet in 1940.

Nazarbayev first brought up the topic of using the Latin alphabet instead of the Cyrillic alphabet as the official script for Kazakh in Kazakhstan in October 2006. A Kazakh government study released in September 2007 said that a switch to a Latin script over a 10- to 12-year period was feasible, at a cost of $300 million. The transition was halted temporarily on 13 December 2007, with President Nazarbayev declaring: "For 70 years the Kazakhstanis read and wrote in Cyrillic. More than 100 nationalities live in our state. Thus we need stability and peace. We should be in no hurry in the issue of alphabet transformation." However, on 30 January 2015, the Minister of Culture and Sports Arystanbek Muhamediuly announced that a transition plan was underway, with specialists working on the orthography to accommodate the phonological aspects of the language. In presenting this strategic plan in April 2017, Kazakh President Nursultan Nazarbayev described the twentieth century as a period in which the "Kazakh language and culture have been devastated".

Nazarbayev ordered Kazakh authorities to create a Latin Kazakh alphabet by the end of 2017, so written Kazakh could return to a Latin script starting in 2018. , Kazakh is written in Cyrillic in Kazakhstan and Mongolia, in Latin in Kazakhstan, while more than one million Kazakh speakers in China use an Arabic-derived alphabet similar to the one that is used to write Uyghur.

On 26 October 2017, Nazarbayev issued Presidential Decree 569 for the change to a finalized Latin variant of the Kazakh alphabet and ordered that the government's transition to this alphabet be completed by 2025, a decision taken to emphasise Kazakh culture after the era of Soviet rule and to facilitate the use of digital devices. 
However, the initial decision to use a novel orthography employing apostrophes, which make the use of many popular tools for searching and writing text difficult, generated controversy.

Therefore, on 19 February 2018, the Presidential Decree 637 was issued in which the use of apostrophes was discontinued and replaced with the use of diacritics and digraphs, making Kazakh the second Turkic language to use  and  after the Uzbek government adapted them in their version of the Latin alphabet. However, many citizens state that the officially introduced alphabet needs further improvements.

In 2020, the President of Kazakhstan Kassym-Jomart Tokayev called for another revision of the Latin alphabet with a focus on preserving the original sounds and pronunciation of the Kazakh language. This revision, presented to the public in November 2019 by academics from the Baitursynov Institute of Linguistics and specialists belonging to the official working group on script transition, uses umlauts, breves and cedillas instead of digraphs and acute accents, and introduces spelling changes in order to reflect more accurately the phonology of Kazakh. This revision is a slightly modified version of the Turkish alphabet, dropping the letters C, Ç and having four additional letters that do not exist in Turkish: Ä, Q, Ñ and Ū.

In February 2021, Kazakhstan reaffirmed its plans for a gradual transition to a Latin-based Kazakh alphabet through the year 2031.

The Arabic script for Kazakh remains in official use in China and other regions where Kazakh is spoken outside of Kazakhstan and Russia. Unlike the basic Arabic alphabet, which is more properly called an abjad, the adapted Kazakh Arabic script is a true alphabet, with individual characters for each sound in the language.

Phonology 
Kazakh exhibits tongue-root vowel harmony, with some words of recent foreign origin (usually of Russian or Arabic origin) as exceptions. There is also a system of rounding harmony which resembles that of Kyrgyz, but which does not apply as strongly and is not reflected in the orthography. This system only applies to the open vowels  and not , and happens in the next syllables. Thus, (in Latin script)  ‘star’,  ‘today’, and  ‘big’ are actually pronounced as jūldūz, bügün, ülkön.

Consonants
The following chart depicts the consonant inventory of standard Kazakh; many of the sounds, however, are allophones of other sounds or appear only in recent loan-words. The 18 consonant phonemes listed by Vajda are without parentheses—since these are phonemes, their listed place and manner of articulation are very general, and will vary from what is shown. (/t͡s/ rarely appears in normal speech.) Kazakh has 19 native consonant phonemes; these are the stops /p, b, t, d, k, g, q/, fricatives /s, z, ɕ, ʑ, ʁ/, nasals /m, n, ŋ/, liquids /ɾ, l/, and two glides /w, j/. The sounds /f, v, χ, h, t͡s, t͡ɕ/ are found only in loanwords. The sounds [q] and [ʁ] may be analyzed as allophones of /k/ and /g/ in words with back vowels, but exceptions occur in loanwords.

In addition, /q/, /ɡ/, and /b/ are lenited intervocalically (between vowels) to [χ], [ɣ], and [β]. In loanwords, voiced stops syllable-finally become devoiced.

 These consonants, given in IPA above, demonstrate certain changes from their Turkic counterparts, changes that are in general principled. Four such patterns are immediately recognizable: (i) Turkic /t͡ɕ/ corresponds to Kazakh /ɕ/, e.g. /qat͡ɕ/ to /qaɕ/ ‘run away’; (ii) Turkic /ɕ/ in turn corresponds to Kazakh /s/ in final position, e.g. /tyɕ/ to /tys/ ‘fall down’; (iii) Turkic /j/ corresponds to /ʑ/ in initial position, e.g. /jaz/ to /ʑaz/ ‘write’ and, (iv) Turkic /ɣ/ corresponds to Kazakh /w/ in final position /aɣ/ to /aw/ ‘net’ (see also Krueger 1980, Johanson 2009).

Vowels
Kazakh has a system of 12 phonemic vowels, 3 of which are diphthongs. The rounding contrast and  generally only occur as phonemes in the first syllable of a word, but do occur later allophonically; see the section on harmony below for more information. Moreover, the  sound has been included artificially due to the influence of Arabic, Persian and, later, Tatar languages during the Islamic period.

According to Vajda, the front/back quality of vowels is actually one of neutral versus retracted tongue root.

Phonetic values are paired with the corresponding character in Kazakh's Cyrillic and current Latin alphabets.

Vowel harmony 
Like almost all Turkic languages, Kazakh has vowel harmony (sometimes called "hard and soft vowels"). That is, syllables containing back vowels can only be followed by ones containing back vowels, and vice versa. Phonologically, i (и), u (у), and iu (ю) may depend on preceding or succeeding vowels, if the vowels are back, these are pronounced , and if the vowels are front, these are pronounced . When not preceded or succeeded by other vowels, the three letters are usually pronounced  (except in the case of mi/ми "brain" where they are pronounced as ). Additionally, [ʊw, jʊw, ʉw, jʉw] are delabialized to [əw, jəw, ɪw, jɪw] in non-initial syllables (or not so strongly labialized if there is a labial in the first syllable).

Back vowels caused preceding -k-/-к- and -g-/-г- to be pronounced as -q-/-қ- and -ğ-/-ғ- in suffixes, respectively (-ğa/-ға vs. -ge/-ге "dative case suffix").

Stress 
Most words in Kazakh are stressed in the last syllable, except:
 When counting objects, numbers are stressed in the first syllable, but stressed in the last syllable in collective numbers suffixed by -eu (bıreu, altau from bır, alty):
bir, ekı, üş, tört, bes, alty, jetı, ...
one, two, three, four, five, six, seven, ...
 Definite and negative pronouns are stressed in the first syllable:
bärıne  eşkımge 
to everyone, to no one

Morphology and syntax 
Kazakh is generally verb-final, though various permutations on SOV (subject–object–verb) word order can be used, for example, due to topicalization. Inflectional and derivational morphology, both verbal and nominal, in Kazakh, exists almost exclusively in the form of agglutinative suffixes. Kazakh is a nominative-accusative, head-final, left-branching, dependent-marking language.

Pronouns 

There are eight personal pronouns in Kazakh:

The declension of the pronouns is outlined in the following chart. Singular pronouns exhibit irregularities, while plural pronouns don't. Irregular forms are highlighted in bold.

In addition to the pronouns, there are several more sets of morphemes dealing with person.

Tense, aspect and mood
Kazakh may express different combinations of tense, aspect and mood through the use of various verbal morphology or through a system of auxiliary verbs, many of which might better be considered light verbs. The present tense is a prime example of this; progressive tense in Kazakh is formed with one of four possible auxiliaries. These auxiliaries "otyr" (sit), "tūr" (stand), "jür" (go) and "jat" (lie), encode various shades of meaning of how the action is carried out and also interact with the lexical semantics of the root verb: telic and non-telic actions, semelfactives, durative and non-durative, punctual, etc. There are selectional restrictions on auxiliaries: motion verbs, such as бару (go) and келу (come) may not combine with "otyr". Any verb, however, can combine with "jat" (lie) to get a progressive tense meaning.

While it is possible to think that different categories of aspect govern the choice of auxiliary, it is not so straightforward in Kazakh. Auxiliaries are internally sensitive to the lexical semantics of predicates, for example, verbs describing motion:

In addition to the complexities of the progressive tense, there are many auxiliary-converb pairs that encode a range of aspectual, modal, volitional, evidential and action- modificational meanings. For example, the pattern verb + köru, with the auxiliary verb köru (see), indicates that the subject of the verb attempted or tried to do something (compare the Japanese てみる temiru construction).

Annotated text with gloss 
From the first stanza of "Menıñ Qazaqstanym" ("My Kazakhstan"), the national anthem of Kazakhstan:

See also

 BGN/PCGN romanization of Kazakh
 Turkic languages
 Kazakh literature
 Languages of Kazakhstan
 Kazakh Sign Language

References

Further reading

 
 Mark Kirchner: "Kazakh and Karakalpak". In: The Turkic languages. Ed. by Lars Johanson and É. Á. Csató. London [u.a.] : Routledge, 1998. (Routledge language family descriptions). S.318-332.

External links

Kazakh Cyrillic–Latin (new) converter
Kazakh Cyrillic–Latin (old)–Arabic converter
Kazakh language, alphabet and pronunciation
Aliya S. Kuzhabekova, "Past, Present and Future of Language Policy in Kazakhstan" (M.A. thesis, University of North Dakota, 2003)
Kazakh language recordings, British Library
Kazakh – Apertium
Kazakh<>Turkish Dictionary
 Kazakhstan in the CIA World Factbook
 US Peace Corps Kazakh Language Courses transcribed to HTML

 
Agglutinative languages
Languages of Kazakhstan
Languages of China
Languages of Russia
Turkic languages
Vowel-harmony languages
Subject–object–verb languages
Languages of Uzbekistan
Languages of Mongolia
Articles containing video clips